Trnava is a city in Slovakia.

Trnava may also refer to:

 Trnava, Osijek-Baranja County, a village and a municipality near Osijek, Croatia (pop. 631/1,600)
 Trnava, Zagreb, a section of Donja Dubrava, Zagreb, Croatia (pop. 9,593)
 Trnava, Brod-Posavina County, a village near Gornji Bogićevci, Croatia (pop. 169)
 Trnava Cabunska, a village near Suhopolje, Virovitica-Podravina County (pop. 42)
 Trnava (Međimurje), a river in Međimurje County, Croatia
 Trnava (Čačak), a village near Čačak, Serbia (pop. 2902)
 Trnava (Čajetina), a village near Čajetina, Serbia (pop. 198)
 Trnava (Jagodina), a village near Jagodina, Serbia (pop. 2391)
 Trnava (Novi Pazar), a village near Novi Pazar, Serbia (pop. 879)
 Trnava (Preševo), a village near Preševo, Serbia (pop. 1160)
 Trnava (Raška), a village near Raška, Serbia (pop. 217)
 Trnava (Užice), a village in the vicinity of Užice, Serbia (pop. 378)
 Trnava (Podujevo), a village near Podujevo, Kosovo
 Donja Trnava, several villages in Serbia
 Gornja Trnava, several villages in Serbia
 Rajčinovićka Trnava, a village near Novi Pazar, Serbia (pop. 189)
 Trnava, Braslovče, a settlement in the Municipality of Braslovče in Slovenia (pop. 234)

See also 
 Târnava (disambiguation)
 Tarnava (disambiguation)
 Tîrnova (disambiguation)
 Târnova (disambiguation)
 Trnka
 Veliko Tarnovo or simply Tarnovo, a city in Veliko Tarnovo Province, Bulgaria
 Tyrnävä, a town near Oulu, Finland